Renaissance Magazine was a glossy American magazine published bimonthly. Each issue comprised approximately 90 pages, and included articles about the contemporary renaissance faire experience, medieval and renaissance history, castles, heraldry, cooking, and interviews with key individuals in the renaissance fair industry. It was founded in 1996 by Kim Guarnaccia, aka Lady Kimberly, a graduate of Yale University, headquartered in Nantucket, MA. She sold the magazine to Queue, Inc. of Shelton, CT in 2000, but remained as art director and editor-in-chief until 2007. The magazine was then purchased by Lionheart Entertainment LLC in Houston, Texas in 2017 and was finally closed in January 2020.

References

External links
 

Bimonthly magazines published in the United States
History magazines published in the United States
Lifestyle magazines published in the United States
Magazines established in 1996
Magazines published in Connecticut
Mass media in Bridgeport, Connecticut
Medieval reenactment
Renaissance fair
Works about the Renaissance